HIV/AIDS originated in Africa in the early 20th century and is a major public health concern and cause of death in many African countries. AIDS rates vary significantly between countries, though the majority of cases are concentrated in Southern Africa. Although the continent is home to about 15.2 percent of the world's population, more than two-thirds of the total infected worldwide – some 35 million people – were Africans, of whom 15 million have already died. Eastern and Southern Africa alone accounted for an estimated 60 percent of all people living with HIV and 70 percent of all AIDS deaths in 2011. The countries of Eastern and Southern Africa are most affected, AIDS has raised death rates and lowered life expectancy among adults between the ages of 20 and 49 by about twenty years. Furthermore, the life expectancy in many parts of Africa is declining, largely as a result of the HIV/AIDS epidemic with life-expectancy in some countries reaching as low as thirty-nine years.

Countries in North Africa, West Africa and the Horn of Africa have significantly lower prevalence rates, as their populations typically engage in fewer high-risk cultural patterns that promote the spread of the virus in other parts of Africa. Southern Africa is the worst affected region on the continent. As of 2011, HIV has infected at least 10 percent of the population in Botswana, Lesotho, Malawi, Mozambique, Namibia, South Africa, Eswatini, Zambia, and Zimbabwe.

In response, a number of initiatives have been launched in various parts of the continent to educate the public on HIV/AIDS. Among these are combination prevention programs, considered to be the most effective initiative, such as the abstinence, be faithful, use a condom campaign or the Desmond Tutu HIV Foundation's outreach programs.

The number of HIV positive people in Africa receiving anti-retroviral treatment in 2012 was over seven times the number receiving treatment in 2005, with nearly 1 million added in the previous year. Between 2000 and 2018, new HIV infections fell by 37%, and HIV-related deaths fell by 45% with 13.6 million lives saved due to ART in the same period. This achievement was the result of great efforts by national HIV programmes supported by civil society and a range of development partners. It reported that 1.1 million people have been newly infected with HIV in 2018. An estimated 420 000 [340 000−530 000] people died in the African Region from HIV-related causes in 2021, which indicates that mortality has dropped by almost 55% since 2010.

Overview

In a 2019 research article titled "The Impact of HIV & AIDS in Africa", the charitable organization AVERT wrote:

{| class="sortable wikitable"
|+Regional comparisons of HIV in 2011'! World region !! Adult HIV prevalence(ages 15–49)!! Persons livingwith HIV !! AIDS deaths, annual !! New HIVinfections, annual
|-
| Worldwide || align="center" | 0.8% || align="right" | 34,000,000 || align="right" | 1,700,000 || align="right" | 2,500,000
|-
| Sub-Saharan Africa || align="center" | 4.9% || align="right" | 23,500,000 || align="right" | 1,200,000 || align="right" | 1,800,000
|-
| South and Southeast Asia || align="center" | 0.3% || align="right" | 4,000,000 || align="right" | 250,000 || align="right" | 280,000
|-
| Eastern Europe and Central Asia || align="center" | 1.0% || align="right" | 1,400,000 || align="right" | 92,000 || align="right" | 140,000
|-
| East Asia || align="center" | 0.1% || align="right" | 830,000 || align="right" | 59,000 || align="right" | 89,000
|-
| Latin America || align="center" | 0.4% || align="right" | 1,400,000 || align="right" | 54,000 || align="right" | 83,000
|-
| Middle East and North Africa || align="center" | 0.2% || align="right" | 300,000 || align="right" | 23,000 || align="right" | 37,000
|-
| North America || align="center" | 0.6% || align="right" | 1,400,000 || align="right" | 21,000 || align="right" | 51,000
|-
| Caribbean || align="center" | 1.0% || align="right" | 230,000 || align="right" | 10,000 || align="right" | 13,000
|-
| Western and Central Europe || align="center" | 0.2% || align="right" | 900,000 || align="right" | 7,000 || align="right" | 30,000
|-
| Oceania || align="center" | 0.3% || align="right" | 53,000 || align="right" | 1,300 || align="right" | 2,900
|}

Origins of HIV/AIDS in Africa

The earliest known cases of human HIV infection were in western equatorial Africa, probably in southeast Cameroon where groups of the central common chimpanzee live. "Phylogenetic analyses revealed that all HIV-1 strains known to infect humans, including HIV-1 groups M, N, and O, were closely related to just one of these SIV cpz lineages: that found in P. t. troglodytes [Pan troglodytes troglodytes i.e. the central chimpanzee]." It is suspected that the disease jumped to humans from butchering of chimpanzees for human consumption.

Current hypotheses also include that, once the virus jumped from chimpanzees or other apes to humans, medical practices of the 20th century helped HIV become established in human populations by 1930. The virus likely moved from primates to humans when hunters came into contact with the blood of infected primates. The hunters then became infected with HIV and passed on the disease to other humans through bodily fluid contamination. This theory is known as the "Bushmeat theory".

HIV made the leap from rural isolation to rapid urban transmission as a result of urbanization that occurred during the 20th century. There are many reasons why there is such a high prevalence of AIDS in Africa. One of the most formative explanations is the poverty that dramatically impacts the daily lives of Africans. The book, Ethics and AIDS in Africa: A Challenge to Our Thinking, describes how "Poverty has accompanying side-effects, such as prostitution (i.e. the need to sell sex for survival), poor living conditions, education, health and health care, that are major contributing factors to the current spread of HIV/AIDS."

Researchers believe HIV was gradually spread by river travel. All the rivers in Cameroon run into the Sangha River, which joins the Congo River running past Kinshasa in the Democratic Republic of the Congo. Trade along the rivers could have spread the virus, which built up slowly in the human population. By the 1960s, about 2,000 people in Africa may have had HIV, including people in Kinshasa whose tissue samples from 1959 and 1960 have been preserved and studied retrospectively. The first epidemic of HIV/AIDS is believed to have occurred in Kinshasa in the 1970s, signaled by a surge in opportunistic infections such as cryptococcal meningitis, Kaposi's sarcoma, tuberculosis, and pneumonia.

History

Acquired immunodeficiency syndrome (AIDS) is a fatal disease caused by the slow-acting human immunodeficiency virus (HIV). The virus multiplies in the body until it causes immune system damage, leading to diseases of the AIDS syndrome. HIV emerged in Africa in the 1960s and spread to the United States and Europe the following decade. In the 1980s it spread across the globe until it became a pandemic. Some areas of the world were already significantly impacted by AIDS, while in others the epidemic was just beginning. The virus is transmitted by bodily fluid contact including the exchange of sexual fluids, by blood, from mother to child in the womb, and during delivery or breastfeeding. AIDS first was identified in the United States and France in 1981, principally among homosexual men. Then in 1982 and 1983, heterosexual Africans also were diagnosed.

In the late 1980s, international development agencies regarded AIDS control as a technical medical problem rather than one involving all areas of economic and social life. Because public health authorities perceived AIDS to be an urban phenomenon associated with prostitution, they believed that the majority of Africans who lived in "traditional" rural areas would be spared. They believed that the heterosexual epidemic could be contained by focusing prevention efforts on persuading the so-called core transmitters—people such as sex workers and truck drivers, known to have multiple sex partners—to use condoms. These factors retarded prevention campaigns in many countries for more than a decade.

Although many governments in Sub-Saharan Africa denied that there was a problem for years, they have now begun to work toward solutions.

AIDS was at first considered a disease of gay men and drug addicts, but in Africa it took off among the general population. As a result, those involved in the fight against HIV began to emphasize aspects such as preventing transmission from mother to child, or the relationship between HIV and poverty, inequality of the sexes, and so on, rather than emphasizing the need to prevent transmission by unsafe sexual practices or drug injection. This change in emphasis resulted in more funding, but was not effective in preventing a drastic rise in HIV prevalence.

The global response to HIV and AIDS has improved considerably in recent years. Funding comes from many sources, the largest of which are the Global Fund to Fight AIDS, Tuberculosis and Malaria and the President's Emergency Plan for AIDS Relief.

According to the Joint United Nations Program on HIV/AIDS (UNAIDS), the number of HIV positive people in Africa receiving anti-retroviral treatment rose from 1 million to 7.1 million between 2005 and 2012, an 805% increase. Almost 1 million of those patients were treated in 2012. The number of HIV positive people in South Africa who received such treatment in 2011 was 75.2 percent higher than the number in 2009.

Additionally, the number of AIDS-related deaths in 2011 in both Africa as a whole and Sub-Saharan Africa alone was 32 percent less than the number in 2005. The number of new HIV infections in Africa in 2011 was also 33 percent less than the number in 2001, with a "24% reduction in new infections among children from 2009 to 2011". In Sub-Saharan Africa, new HIV positive cases over the same period declined by 25%. According to UNAIDS, these successes have resulted from "strong leadership and shared responsibility in Africa and among the global community".

Prevention of HIV infections

Public education initiatives

Numerous public education initiatives have been launched to curb the spread of HIV in Africa.

The role of stigma

Many activists have drawn attention to stigmatization of those testing as HIV positive. This is due to many factors such as a lack of understanding of the disease, lack of access to treatment, the media, knowing that AIDS is incurable, and prejudices brought on by a cultures beliefs. "When HIV/AIDS became a global disease, Some African leaders played ostrich and said that it was a gay disease found only in the West and Africans did not have to worry because there were no gays and lesbians in Africa". Africans were blind to the already huge epidemic that was infesting their communities. The belief that only homosexuals could contract the diseases was later debunked as the number of heterosexual couples living with HIV increased. Unfortunately there were other rumors being spread by elders in Cameroon. These "elders speculated that HIV/AIDS was a sexually transmitted disease passed on from Fulani women only to non-Fulani men who had sexual contact with them. They also claimed if a man was infected as a result of having sexual contact with a Fulani woman, only a Fulani healer could treat him". This communal belief is shared by many other African cultures who believe that HIV and AIDS originated from women. Because of this belief that men can only get HIV from women many "women are not free to speak of their HIV status to their partners for fear of violence".  In general HIV carries a negative stigma in Sub-Saharan Africa. Unfortunately This stigma makes it very challenging for Sub-Saharan Africans to share that they have HIV because they are afraid of being an outcast from their friends and family. In every Sub-Saharan community HIV is seen as the bringer of death. The common belief is that once you have HIV you are destined to die. People seclude themselves based on these beliefs. They don't tell their family and live with guilt and fear because of HIV. However, there is a way to treat HIV and AIDS the problem is that many are just not aware of how HIV is spread or what effects it has on the body. "80.8% of participants would not sleep in the same room as someone who was HIV positive, while 94.5% would not talk to someone who was HIV positive".

Social stigma plays a significant role in the state of HIV and AIDS infection in Africa. "In a normatively HIV/AIDS-stigmatizing Sub Saharan African communities, this suspicion of one's status by others is also applicable to individuals who are not HIV positive, but who may wish to utilize healthcare services for preventive purposes. This group of individuals under fear of suspicion may avoid being mistakenly identified as stigmatized by simply avoiding HARHS utilization." (151)

"At the individual level, persons living with HIV/AIDS in Sub-Saharan Africa likely want to conceal their stigmatized identities whenever possible in order to gain these rewards associated with having a 'normal' identity. The rewards of being considered normal' in the context of high-HIV-prevalence Sub-Saharan Africa are varied and great... such rewards for which there is empirical support in this context include perceived sexual freedom, avoidance of discrimination, avoidance of community or family rejection, avoidance of losing one's job or residence, and avoidance of losing one's sexual partners. Other potential rewards of being considered normal include avoidance of being associated with promiscuity or prostitution, avoidance of emotional, social and physical isolation and avoidance of being blamed for others' illness" (150).

Combination prevention programs

The Joint United Nations Program on HIV/AIDS defines combination prevention programs as:

"It is the consensus in the HIV scientific community that abstinence, be faithful, use a condom [(ABC)] principles are vital guides for public health intervention, but are better bundled with biomedical prevention approaches; lone behavioral change approaches are not likely to stop the global pandemic." Uganda has replaced its ABC strategy with a combination prevention program because of an increase in the annual HIV infection rate. Most new infections were coming from people in long-term relationships who had multiple sexual partners.

Abstinence, be faithful, use a condom

The abstinence, be faithful, use a condom (ABC) strategy to prevent HIV infection promotes safer sexual behavior and emphasizes the need for fidelity, fewer sexual partners, and a later age of sexual debut. The implementation of ABC differs among those who use it. For example, the President's Emergency Plan for AIDS Relief has focused more on abstinence and fidelity than condoms while Uganda has had a more balanced approach to the three elements.

The effectiveness of ABC is controversial. At the 16th International AIDS Conference in 2006, African countries gave the strategy mixed reviews. In Botswana,

In Nigeria,

In Kenya,

Eswatini in 2010 announced that it was abandoning the ABC strategy because it was a dismal failure in preventing the spread of HIV. "If you look at the increase of HIV in the country while we've been applying the ABC concept all these years, then it is evident that ABC is not the answer," said Dr. Derek von Wissell, Director of the National Emergency Response Council on HIV/AIDS.

Prevention efforts
In 1999, the Henry J. Kaiser Family Foundation and the Bill and Melinda Gates Foundation provided major funding for the Love Life website, an online sexual health and relationship resource for teenagers.

In 2011, the Botswana Ministry of Education introduced new HIV/AIDS educational technology in local schools. The TeachAids prevention software, developed at Stanford University, was distributed to every primary, secondary, and tertiary educational institution in the country, reaching all learners from 6 to 24 years of age nationwide.

African Union's efforts

AIDS Watch Africa

During the Abuja African Union Summit on HIV/AIDS in April 2001, the heads of state and heads of government of Botswana, Ethiopia, Kenya, Mali, Nigeria, Rwanda, South Africa, and Uganda established the AIDS Watch Africa (AWA) advocacy platform. The initiative was formed to "accelerate efforts by Heads of State and Government to implement their commitments for the fight against HIV/AIDS, and to mobilize the required national and international resources." In January 2012, AWA was revitalized to include all of Africa and its objectives were broadened to include malaria and tuberculosis.

Roadmap on Shared Responsibility and Global Solidarity for AIDS, TB and Malaria Response in Africa

In 2012, the African Union adopted a Roadmap on Shared Responsibility and Global Solidarity for AIDS, TB and Malaria Response in Africa.
This Roadmap presents a set of practical African-sourced solutions for enhancing shared responsibility and global solidarity for AIDS ... responses in Africa on a sustainable basis by 2015. The solutions are organized around three strategic pillars: diversified financing; access to medicines; and enhanced health governance. The Roadmap defines goals, results and roles and responsibilities to hold stakeholders accountable for the realization of these solutions between 2012 and 2015.

Preventing HIV transmission from pregnant women to children

The Joint United Nations Program on HIV/AIDS reported that the following sixteen African nations in 2012 "ensure[d] that more than three-quarters of pregnant women living with HIV receive antiretroviral medicine to prevent transmission to their child": Botswana, Gabon, Gambia, Ghana, Mauritius, Mozambique, Namibia, Rwanda, São Tomé and Principe, Seychelles, Sierra Leone, South Africa, Eswatini, Tanzania, Zambia and Zimbabwe.

Causes and spread

Behavioral factors

High-risk behavioral patterns are largely responsible for the significantly greater spread of HIV/AIDS in Sub-Saharan Africa than in other parts of the world. Chief among these are the traditionally liberal attitudes espoused by many communities inhabiting the subcontinent toward multiple sexual partners and pre-marital and outside marriage sexual activity. HIV transmission is most likely in the first few weeks after infection, and is therefore increased when people have more than one sexual partner in the same time period. In most of the developed world outside Africa, this means HIV transmission is high among prostitutes and other people who may have more than one sexual partner concurrently. Within the cultures of sub-Saharan Africa, it is relatively common for both men and women to be carrying on sexual relations with more than one person, which promotes HIV transmission. This practice is known as concurrency, which Helen Epstein describes in her book, The Invisible Cure: Africa, the West, and the Fight against AIDS, in which her research into the sexual mores of Uganda revealed the high frequency with which men and women engage in concurrent sexual relationships. In addition, in sub-Saharan Africa AIDS is the leading killer and a large reason for the high transmission rates is because of the lack of education provided to youth. When infected, most children die within one year because of the lack of treatment. All demographic populations in Sub-Saharan Africa have been infected with HIV, from men to women, and from pregnant woman to children. Rather than having more of a specific group infected, male or female, the ratio of men and women infected with HIV are quite similar. With the HIV infection, 77% of men, women, and children, develop AIDS, and die in Sub-Saharan Africa. In addition, "more than 90% of AIDS orphans and children [were] infected with HIV".

Lack of money is an obvious challenge, although a great deal of aid is distributed throughout developing countries with high HIV/AIDS rates. For African countries with advanced medical facilities, patents on many drugs have hindered the ability to make low cost alternatives.

Natural disasters and conflict are also major challenges, as the resulting economic problems people face can drive many young women and girls into patterns of sex work in order to ensure their livelihood or that of their family, or else to obtain safe passage, food, shelter or other resources. Emergencies can also lead to greater exposure to HIV infection through new patterns of sex work. In Mozambique, an influx of humanitarian workers and transporters, such as truck drivers, attracted sex workers from outside the area. Similarly, in the Turkana District of northern Kenya, drought led to a decrease in clients for local sex workers, prompting the sex workers to relax their condom use demands and search for new truck driver clients on main highways and in peri-urban settlements.

Health industry
Sub-Saharan "Africans have always appreciated the importance of health care because good health is seen as necessary for the continuation and growth of their lineage". Without proper health the culture will not be able to thrive and grow. Unfortunately, "health services in many countries are swamped by the need to care for increasing numbers of infected and sick people. Ameliorative drugs are too expensive for most victims, except for a very small number who are affluent". The greatest number of sick people with the fewest doctors, Sub-Saharan Africa "has 11 percent of the world's population but carries 24 percent of the global disease burden. With less than 1 percent of global health expenditure and only 3 percent of the world's health workers".

When family members get sick with HIV or other sicknesses, family members often end up selling most of their belongings in order to provide health care for the individual. Medical facilities in many African countries are lacking. Many health care workers are also not available, in part due to lack of training by governments and in part due to the wooing of these workers by foreign medical organizations where there is a need for medical professionals. Unfortunately, many individuals who get a medical degree end up leaving Sub-Saharan Africa to work abroad "either to escape instability or to practice where they have better working conditions and a higher salary". Many low income communities are very far away from a hospital and they cannot afford to bus there or pay for medical attention once they arrive. "Healthcare in Africa differs widely, depending on the country and also the region – those living in urban areas are more likely to receive better healthcare services than those in rural or remote regions". It is very common to just wait out a sickness or seek help from a neighbor or relative.  Currently antiretroviral therapy is the closest to a cure. However, many hospitals lack enough antiretroviral drugs to treat everyone. This may be because most Sub-Saharan African countries invest "as little as 1-4 dollars per capita, [so] overseas aid is a major source of funding for healthcare". Many overseas organizations are very hesitant to give antiretroviral drugs to Sub-Saharan Africa because they are expensive, which means that there is only so much they can give. Relying on other countries for help in general requires more paperwork and faith in another country very far away. Also, delivery of drugs and other aid takes many month and years to arrive in the hands of those that need help.

Medical factors

Circumcision

According to a 2007 report, male and female circumcision were statistically associated with an increased incidence of HIV infection among the females in Kenya and the males in Kenya, Lesotho, and Tanzania who self-reported that they both underwent the procedure and were virgins. "Among adolescents, regardless of sexual experience, circumcision was just as strongly associated with prevalent HIV infection." Circumcised adults, however, were statistically less likely to be HIV positive than their uncircumcised counterparts, especially among older age groups.

Similarly, a randomized, controlled intervention trial in South Africa from 2005 found that male circumcision "provides a degree of protection against acquiring HIV infection [by males], equivalent to what a vaccine of high efficacy would have achieved".

Medical suspicion

There are high levels of medical suspicion throughout Africa, and there is evidence that such distrust may have a significant impact on the use of medical services. The distrust of modern medicine is sometimes linked to theories of a "Western Plot" of mass sterilization or population reduction, perhaps a consequence of several high-profile incidents involving western medical practitioners.

Pharmaceutical industry

African countries are also still fighting against what they perceive as unfair practices in the international pharmaceutical industry. Medical experimentation occurs in Africa on many medications, but once approved, access to the drug is difficult.

South African scientists in a combined effort with American scientists from Gilead Sciences recently tested and found effective a tenofovir-based anti-retroviral vaginal gel that could be used as pre-exposure prophylaxis. Testing of this gel was conducted at the University of KwaZulu-Natal in Durban, South Africa. The FDA in the US is in the process of reviewing the drug for approval for US use. The AIDS/HIV epidemic has led to the rise in unethical medical experimentation in Africa.

Since the epidemic is widespread, African governments sometimes relax their laws in order to get research conducted in their countries which they would otherwise not afford.  However, global organizations such as the Clinton Foundation, are working to reduce the cost of HIV/AIDS medications in Africa and elsewhere. For example, the philanthropist Inder Singh oversaw a program which reduced the cost of pediatric HIV/AIDS drugs by between 80 and 92 percent by working with manufacturers to reduce production and distribution costs.  Manufacturers often cite distribution and production difficulties in developing markets, which create a substantial barrier to entry.

Political factors

Major African political leaders have denied the link between HIV and AIDS, favoring alternate theories. The scientific community considers the evidence that HIV causes AIDS to be conclusive and rejects AIDS-denialist claims as pseudoscience based on conspiracy theories, faulty reasoning, cherry picking, and misrepresentation of mainly outdated scientific data.

Subtype factor
In Africa, subtype C of HIV-1 is very common, whereas it is rare in America or Europe. People with subtype C progress to AIDS faster than those with subtype A, the predominant subtype in America and Europe (see HIV disease progression rates#HIV subtype variation and effect on progression rates).

Religious factors

Pressure from both Christian and Muslim religious leaders has resulted in the banning of a number of safe-sex campaigns, including condom promoting advertisements being banned in Kenya.

Health Care delivery
While there is currently no cure or vaccine for HIV/AIDS there are emerging treatments. It has been extensively discussed that antiretroviral drugs (ART) are crucial for preventing the acquiring of AIDS. AIDS is acquired at the final stage of the HIV virus, which can be completely averted. It is overwhelmingly possible to live with the virus and never acquire AIDS. The proper obedience to ART drugs can provide an infected person with a limitless future. ART drugs are key in preventing the diseases from progressing as well as ensuring the disease is well controlled, thus forbidding the disease from becoming resistant to the treatments. In countries like Nigeria and the Central African Republic, a mere less than 25% of the population has access to the ART drugs. Funds devoted to ART drug access were measured at $19.1 billion in 2013 in low and middle-income countries among the region, however the funds were short of the UNAIDS' previous resource needs estimates of $22–24 billion by 2015.

Measurement

Prevalence measures include everyone living with HIV and AIDS, and present a delayed representation of the epidemic by aggregating the HIV infections of many years. Incidence, in contrast, measures the number of new infections, usually over the previous year. There is no practical, reliable way to assess incidence in Sub-Saharan Africa. Prevalence in 15- to 24-year-old pregnant women attending antenatal clinics is sometimes used as an approximation. The test done to measure prevalence is a sero survey in which blood is tested for the presence of HIV.

Health units that conduct sero surveys rarely operate in remote rural communities, and the data collected also does not measure people who seek alternate healthcare. Extrapolating national data from antenatal surveys relies on assumptions which may not hold across all regions and at different stages in an epidemic.

Thus, there may be significant disparities between official figures and actual HIV prevalence in some countries.

A minority of scientists claim that as many as 40 percent of HIV infections in African adults may be caused by unsafe medical practices rather than by sexual activity. The World Health Organization states that about 2.5 percent of HIV infections in Sub-Saharan Africa are caused by unsafe medical injection practices and the "overwhelming majority" by unprotected sex.

Regional prevalence

In contrast to areas in North Africa and the Horn of Africa, traditional cultures and religions in Sub-Saharan Africa have generally exhibited a more liberal attitude to female out-of-marriage sexual activity. The latter includes practices such as multiple sexual partners and unprotected sex, high-risk cultural patterns that have been implicated in the much greater spread of HIV in the subcontinent.

North Africa

Horn of Africa

As with North Africa, the HIV infection rates in the Horn of Africa are quite low. This has been attributed to the Muslim nature of many of the local communities and adherence to Islamic morals.

Ethiopia's HIV prevalence rate has decreased from 3.6 percent in 2001 to 1.4 percent in 2011. The number of new infections per year also has decreased from 130,000 in 2001 to 24,000 in 2011.

Central Africa

HIV infection rates in central Africa are moderate to high.

Eastern Africa

HIV infection rates in eastern Africa are moderate to high.

Kenya

Kenya, according to a 2008 report from the Joint United Nations Program on HIV/AIDS, had the third largest number of individuals in Sub-Saharan Africa living with HIV. It also had the highest prevalence rate of any country outside of Southern Africa. Kenya's HIV infection rate dropped from around 14 percent in the mid-1990s to 5 percent in 2006, but rose again to 6.2 percent by 2011. The number of newly infected people per year, however, decreased by almost 30 percent, from 140,000 in 2001 to 100,000 in 2011.

As of 2012, Nyanza Province had the highest HIV prevalence rate at 13.9 percent, with the North Eastern Province having the lowest rate at 0.9 percent.

Christian men and women also had a higher infection rate than their Muslim counterparts. This discrepancy was especially visible among women, with Muslim women showing a rate of 2.8 percent versus 8.4 percent among Protestant women and 8 percent among Catholic women. HIV was also more common among the wealthiest than among the poorest (7.2 percent versus 4.6 percent).

Historically, HIV had been more prevalent in urban than rural areas, although the gap is closing rapidly. Men in rural areas are now more likely to be HIV-infected (at 4.5 percent) than those in urban areas (at 3.7 percent).

Tanzania

Between 2004 and 2008, the HIV incidence rate in Tanzania for ages 15–44 slowed to 3.37 per 1,000 person-years (4.42 for women and 2.36 for men). The number of newly infected people per year increased slightly, from 140,000 in 2001 to 150,000 in 2011. There were also significantly fewer HIV infections in Zanzibar, which in 2011 had a prevalence rate of 1.0 percent compared to 5.3 percent in mainland Tanzania.

Uganda

Uganda has registered a gradual decrease in its HIV rates from 10.6 percent in 1997, to a stabilized 6.5–7.2 percent since 2001. This has been attributed to changing local behavioral patterns, with more respondents reporting greater use of contraceptives and a two-year delay in first sexual activity as well as fewer people reporting casual sexual encounters and multiple partners.

The number of newly infected people per year, however, has increased by over 50 percent, from 99,000 in 2001 to 150,000 in 2011. More than 40 percent of new infections are among married couples, indicating widespread and increasing infidelity. This increase has caused alarm. The director of the Centre for Disease Control – Uganda, Wuhib Tadesse, said in 2011 that,

Western Africa

Western Africa has moderate levels of infection of both HIV-1 and HIV-2. The onset of the HIV epidemic in the region began in 1985 with reported cases in Senegal, Benin, and Nigeria. These were followed in 1986 by Côte d'Ivoire. The first identification of HIV-2 occurred in Senegal by microbiologist Souleymane Mboup and his collaborators.

HIV prevalence in western Africa is lowest in Senegal and highest in Nigeria, which has the second largest number of people living with HIV in Africa after South Africa. Nigeria's infection rate (number of patients relative to the entire population), however, is much lower (3.7 percent) compared to South Africa's (17.3 percent).

In Niger in 2011, the national HIV prevalence rate for ages 15–49 was 0.8 percent while for sex workers it was 36 percent.

Southern Africa

In the mid-1980s, HIV and AIDS were virtually unheard of in southern Africa. However, it is now the worst-affected region in the world. Currently, Eswatini and Lesotho have the highest and second highest HIV prevalence rates in the world, respectively. Of the nine southern African countries (Botswana, Lesotho, Malawi, Mozambique, Namibia, South Africa, Eswatini, Zambia, and Zimbabwe), four are estimated to have an infection rate of over 15 percent.

In Botswana, the number of newly infected people per year has declined by 67 percent, from 27,000 in 2001 to 9,000 in 2011. In Malawi, the decrease has been 54 percent, from 100,000 in 2001 to 46,000 in 2011. All but two of the other countries in this region have also recorded major decreases (Namibia, 62 percent; Zambia, 54 percent; Zimbabwe, 47 percent; South Africa, 38 percent; Eswatini, 32 percent). The number has remained virtually the same in Lesotho and Mozambique.

Zimbabwe's first reported case of HIV was in 1985.

There are widespread practices of sexual networking that involve multiple overlapping or concurrent sexual partners. Men's sexual networks, in particular, tend to be quite extensive, a fact that is tacitly accepted or even encouraged by many communities. Along with having multiple sexual partners, unemployment and population displacements resulting from drought and conflict have contributed to the spread of HIV/AIDS. According to Susser and Stein (2000), men refuse to use condoms during intercourse with girls or women performing sex work (p. 1043–1044). Unfortunately, the girls and women are in desperate need of money and do not have a choice. This leads to multiple sex partners, which increases the likelihood of their infection with HIV/AIDS.

A 2008 study in Botswana, Namibia, and Eswatini found that intimate partner violence, extreme poverty, education, and partner income disparity explained almost all of the differences in HIV status among adults aged 15–29 years. Among young women with any one of these factors, the HIV rate increased from 7.7 percent with no factors to 17.1 percent. Approximately 26 percent of young women with any two factors were HIV positive, with 36 percent of those with any three factors and 39.3 percent of those with all four factors being HIV-positive.

Eswatini

As of 2011, the HIV prevalence rate in Eswatini was the highest in the world at 26.0 percent of persons aged 15–49. The United Nations Development Program wrote in 2005,

The HIV epidemic in Eswatini has reduced its life expectancy at birth to 49 for men and 51 for women (based on 2009 data). Life expectancy at birth in 1990 was 59 for men and 62 for women.

Based on 2011 data, Eswatini's crude death rate of 19.51 per 1,000 people per year was the third highest in the world, behind only Lesotho and Sierra Leone. HIV/AIDS in 2002 caused 64 percent of all deaths in the country.

Tuberculosis coinfections

Much of the deadliness of the epidemic in Sub-Saharan Africa is caused by a deadly synergy between HIV and tuberculosis, termed a "co-epidemic". The two diseases have been "inextricably bound together" since the beginning of the HIV epidemic. "Tuberculosis and HIV co-infections are associated with special diagnostic and therapeutic challenges and constitute an immense burden on healthcare systems of heavily infected countries like Ethiopia." In many countries without adequate resources, the tuberculosis case rate has increased five to ten-fold since the identification of HIV. Without proper treatment, an estimated 90 percent of persons living with HIV die within months after contracting tuberculosis. The initiation of highly active antiretroviral therapy in persons coinfected with tuberculosis can cause an immune reconstitution inflammatory syndrome with a worsening, in some cases severe worsening, of tuberculosis infection and symptoms.

An estimated 874,000 people in Sub-Saharan Africa were living with both HIV and tuberculosis in 2011, with 330,000 in South Africa, 83,000 in Mozambique, 50,000 in Nigeria, 47,000 in Kenya, and 46,000 in Zimbabwe. In terms of cases per 100,000 population, Eswatini's rate of 1,010 was by far the highest in 2011. In the following 20 African countries, the cases-per-100,000 coinfection rate has increased at least 20 percent between 2000 and 2011: Algeria, Angola, Chad, Comoros, Republic of the Congo, Democratic Republic of the Congo, Equatorial Guinea, The Gambia, Lesotho, Liberia, Mauritania, Mauritius, Morocco, Mozambique, Senegal, Sierra Leone, South Africa, Eswatini, Togo, and Tunisia.

Since 2004, however, tuberculosis-related deaths among people living with HIV have fallen by 28 percent in Sub-Saharan Africa, which is home to nearly 80 percent of the people worldwide who are living with both diseases.

 See also 

 28: Stories of AIDS in Africa
 Demographics of Africa
 The Global Fund to Fight AIDS, Tuberculosis and Malaria
 HIV/AIDS in Eswatini
 HIV/AIDS in Malawi
 HIV/AIDS in Asia
 HIV/AIDS in Australia
 HIV/AIDS in Europe
 HIV/AIDS in North America
 HIV/AIDS in South America
 Origin of AIDS
 President's Emergency Plan for AIDS Relief
 South African model of the pandemic
 Syphilis in sub-Saharan Africa
 United Nations Special Envoy for HIV/AIDS in Africa

Notes

 References 

 Further reading 

 
 
 
 

 External links 

 AIDS: Voices From Africa  - slideshow by Life magazine''
 AIDS at UNFPA
 Visualization tool for HIV/AIDS prevalence in sub-Saharan Africa from 2000 to 2017

 
Development in Africa
Health disasters in Africa